In the mathematical theory of bifurcations, a Hopf bifurcation is a critical point where a system's stability switches and a periodic solution arises. More accurately, it is a local bifurcation in which a fixed point of a dynamical system loses stability, as a pair of complex conjugate eigenvalues—of the linearization around the fixed point—crosses the complex plane imaginary axis. Under reasonably generic assumptions about the dynamical system, a small-amplitude limit cycle branches from the fixed point.

A Hopf bifurcation is also known as a Poincaré–Andronov–Hopf bifurcation, named after Henri Poincaré, Aleksandr Andronov and Eberhard Hopf.

Overview

Supercritical and subcritical Hopf bifurcations 

The limit cycle is orbitally stable if a specific quantity called the first Lyapunov coefficient is negative, and the bifurcation is supercritical. Otherwise it is unstable and the bifurcation is subcritical.

The normal form of a Hopf bifurcation is:

 where z, b are both complex and λ is a parameter.

Write:  The number α is called the first Lyapunov coefficient.

 If α is negative then there is a stable limit cycle for λ > 0:

 where

 The bifurcation is then called supercritical.
 If α is positive then there is an unstable limit cycle for λ < 0.  The bifurcation is called subcritical.

Intuition 
The normal form of the supercritical Hopf bifurcation can be expressed intuitively in polar coordinates,
 
The angular velocity  is fixed. The system thus describes a stable circular limit cycle with radius  and angular velocity . When  then  is the only fixed point and it is stable. In that case, the system describes a spiral that converges to the origin.

Cartesian coordinates 
 
and

Subcritical case 
 
For  the limit cycle is now unstable and the origin is stable.

Example 

Hopf bifurcations occur in the Lotka–Volterra model of predator–prey interaction (known as paradox of enrichment), the Hodgkin–Huxley model for nerve membrane potential, the Selkov model of glycolysis, the Belousov–Zhabotinsky reaction, the Lorenz attractor, the Brusselator, Classical electromagnetism. Hopf bifurcations have also been shown to occur in fission waves.

The Selkov model is

 

The phase portrait illustrating the Hopf bifurcation in the Selkov model is shown on the right.

In railway vehicle systems, Hopf bifurcation analysis is notably important. Conventionally a railway vehicle's stable motion at low speeds crosses over to unstable at high speeds. One aim of the nonlinear analysis of these systems is to perform an analytical investigation of bifurcation, nonlinear lateral stability and hunting behavior of rail vehicles on a tangent track, which uses the Bogoliubov method.

Definition of a Hopf bifurcation 

The appearance or the disappearance of a periodic orbit through a local change in the stability properties of a fixed point is known as the Hopf bifurcation. The following theorem works for fixed points with one pair of conjugate nonzero purely imaginary eigenvalues. It tells the conditions under which this bifurcation phenomenon occurs.

Theorem (see section 11.2 of ). Let  be the Jacobian of a continuous parametric dynamical system evaluated at a steady point . Suppose that all eigenvalues of  have negative real part except one conjugate nonzero purely imaginary pair . A Hopf bifurcation arises when these two eigenvalues cross the imaginary axis because of a variation of the system parameters.

Routh–Hurwitz criterion 

Routh–Hurwitz criterion (section I.13 of ) gives necessary conditions so that a Hopf bifurcation occurs. Let us see how one can use concretely this idea.

Sturm series 

Let  be Sturm series associated to a characteristic polynomial . They can be written in the form:

Their definition is related to the associated Hurwitz matrix.

Propositions 

Proposition 1. If all the Hurwitz determinants  are positive, apart perhaps  then the associated Jacobian has no pure imaginary eigenvalues.

Proposition 2.

The conditions that we are looking for so that a Hopf bifurcation occurs (see theorem above) for a parametric continuous dynamical system are given by this last proposition.

Example 

Consider the classical Van der Pol oscillator written with ordinary differential equations:

The Jacobian matrix associated to this system follows:

The characteristic polynomial (in ) of the linearization at (0,0) is equal to:

The coefficients are:
 
The associated Sturm series is:

The Sturm polynomials can be written as (here ):

The above proposition 2 tells that one must have:

Because 1 > 0 and −1 < 0 are obvious, one can conclude that a Hopf bifurcation may occur for Van der Pol oscillator if .

See also
 Reaction–diffusion systems

References

Further reading

External links

 The Hopf Bifurcation
 Andronov–Hopf bifurcation page at Scholarpedia

Bifurcation theory
Circuit theorems